Pressana is a comune (municipality) in the Province of Verona in the Italian region Veneto, located about  west of Venice and about  southeast of Verona.

The municipality of Pressana contains the frazioni (subdivisions, mainly villages and hamlets) Albero Piocioso, Bertolde, Caselle, Castelletto, Colombara, Crosare, Oca, Piovega, San Francesco, San Sebastiano, and Vignaletto.

Pressana borders the following municipalities: Cologna Veneta, Minerbe, Montagnana, Roveredo di Guà, and Veronella.

References

External links
 Official website

Cities and towns in Veneto